Nawang Rigzin Jora is an Indian politician and former Minister for Urban Development and Urban Local Bodies, Ladakh, India.

Early life and education

Nawang Rigzin Jora was born in Ladakh, then part of Jammu and Kashmir, India, 2 February 1958. He is an alumnus of St. Stephen's college Delhi.

Political career
Nawang Rigzin Jora is a former Minister for Urban Development and Urban Local Bodies. Before that he was Minister for Tourism & Culture. Before joining politics he was a member of the Ladakh Buddhist Association, Leh, a strong organisation and a member of World Buddhist Fellowship, and actively participated in an agitation for grant of Union Territory Status for Ladakh region. Later when in a compromise between the government of India and the Ladakh Buddhist Association a separate administrative unit " The Ladakh Autonomous Hill Development Council, Leh" was created in 1995, he became one of the four Executive Councillors of the newly constituted "Ladakh Autonomous Hill Development Council" under the leadership of the former president of Ladakh Buddhist Association Mr. Thupstan Chhewang.

Personal life
He is married to  Tsetan Dolker of Lachumir and has a son and a daughter.

References

External links
https://web.archive.org/web/20190810004313/https://jkgad.nic.in/

http://jkgad.nic.in/councilindex.shtml

1958 births
Living people
Ladakh politicians
Jammu and Kashmir MLAs 2014–2018
Indian National Congress politicians